In July 2011, the men's national football teams of Solomon Islands and Vanuatu met for four games, with two hosted by each country. The first two were held in the Solomons on and around its Independence Day (7 July). They were followed by two in Vanuatu on and around that country's Independence Day (30 July). Thus the competition(s) conformed to the spirit of the seemingly defunct Wantok Cup, although it is not certain whether that name was formally used for this event.

Vanuatu won 3–2 on aggregate over the span of the four games, though they should probably be considered two separate competitions (as the Wantok Cup was initially intended), in which case each country won its own Independence Day event.

1st: Solomon Islands Independence Day

Schedule and results

Table

2nd: Vanuatu Independence Day

Schedule and results

Table

Notes and references

2011
2011–12 in OFC football
2011
2011
2011 in Solomon Islands sport
2011–12 in Vanuatuan football